Rhonda Lee Rompola (born March 9, 1960) is an American college basketball coach who was most recently the head women's basketball coach at Southern Methodist University (SMU) from 1991 to 2016.

Early life and education
Rompola was born and raised in Sayreville, New Jersey. She graduated from Sayreville War Memorial High School in 1978. From 1978 to 1980, Rompola played basketball at Old Dominion University in Norfolk, Virginia, averaging 10.3 points, 4.3 rebounds, and 3.5 assists and was part of two AIAW championship teams. Rompola transferred to SMU in Dallas. After redshirting one season per NCAA transfer rules, Rompola played at forward at SMU from 1981 to 1983. With 21.3 points per game, Rompola was SMU's leading scorer in 1981–82. She graduated in 1983 with a business degree.

Coaching career
From 1983 to 1991, Rompola was an assistant coach at SMU before being promoted to head coach.

In her first season as coach in 1991–92, she posted a 17–12 record, the team's first winning season since 1981–82 when she was a player. Overall, she posted a 439–317 record at SMU. In 1998, SMU won its first-ever WAC tournament title, as it defeated 4th-ranked Colorado State University in the final, and then 25th-ranked Toledo in the opening round of the NCAA tournament. In 1998 and 1999, Rompola guided the Mustangs to back-to-back 20-win seasons. She was named the 1999 WAC Coach of the year for her efforts. In 2007, SMU went 24–9, and finished second in Conference USA play with an 11–5 mark. Along with being SMU's all-time leader in coaching wins in any sport, she also earned an honorable mention on the all-time Old Dominion Lady Monarchs basketball team. She coached her 400th victory on February 21, 2013.

Personal life
Previously married to Steven Haddock, Rompola married men's basketball coach Mike Dement in June 2007.

Head coaching record

References 

American women's basketball players
Living people
1960 births
Old Dominion Monarchs women's basketball players
People from Sayreville, New Jersey
Sayreville War Memorial High School alumni
Sportspeople from Middlesex County, New Jersey
SMU Mustangs women's basketball coaches
American women's basketball coaches
Basketball coaches from New Jersey
Basketball players from New Jersey
Forwards (basketball)
Women's Professional Basketball League players